Project C (Chapter 2) is a 2022 Indian Tamil-language drama film directed by Vno and starring Sri, Vasudha Krishnamoorthy and Chaams in the lead roles. It was released on 23 December 2022.

Cast
Sri as Ram
Vasudha Krishnamoorthy
Chaams as Praveen
Ramjee
Balaji Venkatraman
Kovai Gurumurthy

Production
The film marked director Vno's second project after Mangai Maanvizhi Ambugal (2018). The film was marketed as India's first sophomore film, with Chapter 2, later to be followed by a prequel and a sequel. The film's first look poster was released in May 2022 by S. R. Prabhu of Dream Warrior Pictures. The film's producer, Sri, also played the lead role.

Reception
The film was released on 23 December 2022 across Tamil Nadu. A reviewer from Maalai Malar noted the film was "admirable", giving it 2.75 out of 5 stars. The critic from Dina Thanthi also praised the film's suspenseful storytelling. Critic Malini Mannath noted "fairly intriguing in its take, Project C-Chapter 2 could be a one-time watch for hardcore lovers of the genre." A reviewer from Dina Thanthi noted that the director had created a good film.

References

External links

2022 films
2020s Tamil-language films